Roncesvalles is a municipality in the Tolima department of Colombia.  The population of the municipality was 7,647 as of the 1993 census.

Municipalities of Tolima Department